Mudeford Lifeboat Station is the base for Royal National Lifeboat Institution (RNLI) search and rescue operations at Mudeford, Christchurch, Dorset in England. The first lifeboat was stationed on Mudeford Quay 1963 and the present station was opened in 2003. It operates an  inshore lifeboat (ILB).

History
During the 1960s the RNLI deployed inflatable ILBs at places around the coast where a quick response to increasing numbers of leisure boats and water users could not be made by larger all-weather lifeboats (ALBs) at stations established to serve commercial shipping. Mudeford Quay, at the entrance to Christchurch Harbour, was selected as a suitable place and a small inflatable boat provided. This type of boat could only operate in relatively good conditions and were seldom used in the winter. As their usefulness was proven, some stations received an 'intermediate' ILB which could operate in more severe conditions. One of these  boats was stationed at Mudeford in 1981, a new boathouse being opened for it on 28 June.

In 1988 the crew facilities were improved, and the following year a new type of boat arrived, a B Class rigid-hulled inflatable. In 2003 a new boathouse and crew facilities were opened on 25 October.

Description
The crew facilities are in a two-storey building. This is rendered and has a tile roof; large first floor windows at both ends give views across the water. Adjoining this and at right angles is the boathouse. This is built of timber with large windows along one side that allow visitors to see the lifeboat inside. The roof is metal with large skylights. The boat doors open onto a concrete platform and shallow slipway.

Area of operation
Adjacent lifeboats are at Lymington Lifeboat Station to the east, and Poole Lifeboat Station to the west. If a larger ALB is needed in the area it will come from Swanage.

Current fleet
  B-806 Mudeford Servant (on station 2006).

See also
 List of RNLI stations

References

External links

 RNLI station information

Lifeboat stations in Dorset